U.S. Route 50 (US 50) is a major east–west route in the state of Missouri. It is also known as the Rex M. Whitton Expressway in the capital of Missouri, Jefferson City.

Route description
US 50 enters Missouri from Kansas along Interstate 435 (I-435) around Kansas City and then it runs concurrently with I-470 to Lee's Summit. It runs as an expressway to Sedalia before becoming Broadway Boulevard and intersecting with US 65 (Limit Avenue). From Sedalia to California, US 50 becomes a two-lane undivided road, where it has a concurrency with Route 5 from Syracuse to Tipton between Morgan and Moniteau counties. It resumes as an expressway from California to Jefferson City, has a brief distance as a main road, and picks up expressway status again. From just west of Linn to Union, the road is two lanes. Between Linn and Union, US 50 passes through various communities. After passing through Linn as Main Street, it shares short concurrencies with Route 89 and Route 19 between Osage and Gasconade counties and intersects with Route 47 in Union. After going through this city, US 50 is routed along I-44 up to Sunset Hills. It heads east and merges with US 61 and US 67.

These three concurrent U.S. routes run this way until after the interchange with I-55. US 61 and US 67 split off, leaving US 50 to merge with I-255 to cross the Mississippi River on the Jefferson Barracks Bridge in St. Louis.

History
Until 1926, US 50 in Missouri was Route 12.

Major intersections

References

External links

 Missouri
50
Transportation in Jackson County, Missouri
Transportation in Johnson County, Missouri
Transportation in Pettis County, Missouri
Transportation in Morgan County, Missouri
Transportation in Moniteau County, Missouri
Transportation in Cole County, Missouri
Transportation in Osage County, Missouri
Transportation in Gasconade County, Missouri
Transportation in Franklin County, Missouri
Transportation in St. Louis County, Missouri